Kenji Joel Gorré (born 29 September 1994) is a professional footballer who plays as a winger for Primeira Liga club Boavista. Born in the Netherlands, he is the son of former professional footballer Dean Gorré, and represents Curaçao at international level.

Club career

Youth career
Born in Spijkenisse, Netherlands, Gorré lived in Netherlands before moving to England, when his father transferred to Huddersfield Town when he was four and lived in England ever since. Gorré attended North Cestrian Grammar School. Gorré's decision to play football was supported by his parents.

In 2002, Gorré moved from Manchester City Academy to Manchester United Academy. When Gorré was fifteen, Gorré became a transfer target from Arsenal and Chelsea. Despite, Gorré remained at the club and two years later, on 26 July 2011, Gorré scored in a 7–0 win over County Tyrone in the Milk Cup. The following month, Gorré began to start his first year scholars at the academy.

Then in February 2013, Gorré went on trial at Scottish Premier League champions Celtic, but he did not sign on a permanent basis. This came after Gorré was released from the Manchester United Academy.

Swansea City
In March 2013, Gorré began training with Premier League side Swansea City. Gorré made an impressive performance at the trial and convinced the Swansea City management to give him a one-year contract.

Shortly signing for Swansea City, Gorré was featured in the pre-season friendly matches and scored two goals against Excelsior and Haaglandia. Despite being given forty-six shirt, Gorré was sent to the Swansea City Reserves and played there throughout the 2013–14 season.

On 4 July 2014, Gorré signed a new two-year contract keeping him at the club until June 2016. This came after when Gorré was offered a professional contract. Later in the 2014–15 season, Gorré became the top scorer for Swansea Under-21s during the 2014–15 Professional U21 Development League 2 season, and scored twice as the Under-21s won the league title. After impressing for the Under-21s, Gorré made his professional debut for Swansea in a 1–0 Premier League loss away to Crystal Palace on 24 May 2015.

On 6 July 2015, Gorré signed a new three-year contract with Swansea City, keeping him at the club until the summer of 2018. Two days later, on 8 July 2015, Swansea City agreed a deal to loan Gorré out to Dutch side ADO Den Haag, Gorré made his ADO Den Haag debut as a 76th-minute substitute, and set up a goal from a free kick to goalkeeper, Martin Hansen, to score his first ever professional goal, to earn his team a last-minute draw against PSV. However, six days later, Gorré was sent to the reserves to play against Jong Heracles and in the 36th minute, he received a straight red card for a professional foul. After the match, KNVB decided against giving Gorré a game suspension. However, Gorré went on to make five appearances, having spent the first half of the season at ADO Den Haag on the bench and on 30 January 2016, it was confirmed that Gorré had returned to Swansea City following his loan spell at ADO Den Haag.

Following his return from a loan at ADO Den Haag, Gorré returned to the club's reserves and scored on his return, in a 2–1 win over Derby County.

On 29 July 2016, Gorré joined Northampton Town on a six-month loan deal until January 2017.

He was unable to break into the first team at Swansea, and despite being offered a new contract, he left the club at the end of his original three-year deal in June 2018.

Nacional
Following his release by Swansea, Gorré signed for Primeira Liga club Nacional.

In January 2019 he dropped a division to join LigaPro side Estoril on loan until the end of the remaining season.

International career
Gorré was born in the Netherlands to a Surinamese father, Dean Gorré, and a Curaçaoan mother (Magali from The Real Housewives of Cheshire) and is eligible for all three national teams. Gorré is also eligible to play for England, citing having engaged in a minimum of five years education under the age of 18 within the territory of the relevant association. Gorré was initially approached by the English FA before being selected by KNVB instead. He never played for their youth team.

In November 2016, Gorré was called up to and played for the Curaçao national team in their friendly against Eredivisie side Excelsior in Rotterdam. In 2019, he was selected for the country's 2019 Gold Cup squad and made his debut on 25 June 2019 in the last group game against Jamaica. He came on as a substitute in the 70th minute for Jarchinio Antonia, Curaçao equalised in added time to advance to the knock-out stage.

Career statistics

References

External links 
 
 

1994 births
Living people
People educated at North Cestrian Grammar School
Curaçao footballers
Footballers from South Holland
Association football forwards
Curaçao international footballers
2019 CONCACAF Gold Cup players
Curaçao people of Surinamese descent
Manchester City F.C. players
Manchester United F.C. players
Premier League players
Swansea City A.F.C. players
Northampton Town F.C. players
Primeira Liga players
C.D. Nacional players
Liga Portugal 2 players
G.D. Estoril Praia players
Boavista F.C. players
Curaçao expatriate footballers
Dutch emigrants to England
British people of Surinamese descent
Curaçao expatriate sportspeople in Portugal
Expatriate footballers in Portugal
Dutch footballers
People from Spijkenisse
Dutch people of Curaçao descent
Dutch sportspeople of Surinamese descent
Eredivisie players
ADO Den Haag players
Dutch expatriate footballers
Footballers from Greater Manchester
English expatriate sportspeople in Portugal
English expatriate footballers